The Allen Red Devils are the sports teams of Allen Community College located in Iola, Kansas. They participate in the National Junior College Athletic Association and in the Kansas Jayhawk Community College Conference.

Sports

Men's sports
Baseball
Basketball
Cross country
Golf
Soccer
Track & Field

Women's sports
Basketball
Cheer/Dance
Cross country
Soccer
Softball
Track & Field
Volleyball

References

External links

Sports teams in Kansas